Vyacheslav Ivanovich Ivanenko (born March 3, 1961) is a retired race walker who represented the USSR.

Biography 
He won the gold medal over 50 kilometers at the 1988 Summer Olympics in Seoul with a personal best time of 3:38:29. He also won a silver at the 1986 European Championships and a bronze at the 1987 World Championships.

Born in Kemerovo, Ivanenko was awarded the title Honoured Master of Sports of the USSR in 1988 and the Order of Friendship of Peoples.

Ivanenko works in the Kemerovo department of the State Inspection For Traffic Security (GIBDD).

Since 2008, every autumn in Kemerovo on the Vyacheslav's initiative and the support of local authorities Ivanenko Race Walking Cup is taking place.

International competitions

External links
 
 

1961 births
Living people
People from Kemerovo
Sportspeople from Kemerovo Oblast
Soviet male racewalkers
Russian male racewalkers
Olympic athletes of the Soviet Union
Olympic gold medalists for the Soviet Union
Athletes (track and field) at the 1988 Summer Olympics
World Athletics Championships athletes for the Soviet Union
World Athletics Championships medalists
European Athletics Championships medalists
Honoured Masters of Sport of the USSR
Medalists at the 1988 Summer Olympics
Olympic gold medalists in athletics (track and field)